The redcurrant or red currant (Ribes rubrum) is a member of the genus Ribes in the gooseberry family. It is native to western Europe. The species is widely cultivated and has escaped into the wild in many regions.

Description
The flowers are inconspicuous yellow-green, in pendulous  racemes, maturing into bright red translucent edible berries about  diameter, with 3–10 berries on each raceme. An established bush can produce  of berries from mid- to late summer.

Phytochemicals
Redcurrant fruits are known for their tart flavor, a characteristic provided by a relatively high content of organic acids and mixed polyphenols. As many as 65 different phenolic compounds may contribute to the astringent properties of redcurrants, with these contents increasing during the last month of ripening. Twenty-five individual polyphenols and other nitrogen-containing phytochemicals in redcurrant juice have been isolated specifically with the astringent flavor profile sensed in the human tongue.

Cultivation
There are several other similar species native in Europe, Asia and North America, also with edible fruit. These include Ribes spicatum (northern Europe and northern Asia), Ribes alpinum (northern Europe), R. schlechtendalii (northeast Europe), R. multiflorum (southeast Europe), R. petraeum (southwest Europe) and R. triste (North America; Newfoundland to Alaska and southward in mountains).

While Ribes rubrum is native to Europe, large berried cultivars of the redcurrant were first produced in Belgium and northern France in the 17th century. In modern times, numerous cultivars have been selected; some of these have escaped gardens and can be found in the wild across Europe and extending into Asia.

The white currant is also a cultivar of R. rubrum. Although it is a sweeter and albino variant of the redcurrant, not a separate botanical species, it is sometimes marketed with names such as R. sativum or R. silvestre, or sold as a different fruit.

Currant bushes prefer partial to full sunlight and can grow in most types of soil. They are relatively low-maintenance plants and can also be used as ornamentation.

Cultivars
Many redcurrant and whitecurrant cultivars are available for domestic cultivation from specialist growers. The following have gained the Royal Horticultural Society's Award of Garden Merit: 
"Jonkheer van Tets" 
"Red Lake" 
"Stanza" 
"White Grape" (whitecurrant)

Uses

Nutrition

In a  reference serving, redcurrants (or white) supply  of food energy and are a rich source of vitamin C, providing 49% of the Daily Value (DV, table). Vitamin K is the only other essential nutrient in significant content at 10% of DV (table).

Culinary
With maturity, the tart flavour of redcurrant fruit is slightly greater than its blackcurrant relative, but with the same approximate sweetness. The white-fruited variant of redcurrant, often referred to as white currant, has the same tart flavour but with greater sweetness. Although frequently cultivated for jams and cooked preparations, much like the white currant, it is often served raw or as a simple accompaniment in salads, garnishes, or drinks when in season.

In the United Kingdom, redcurrant jelly is a condiment often served with lamb, game meat including venison, turkey and goose in a festive or Sunday roast. It is essentially a jam and is made in the same way, by adding the redcurrants to sugar, boiling, and straining.

In France, the highly rarefied and hand-made Bar-le-duc or "Lorraine jelly" is a spreadable preparation traditionally made from white currants or alternatively redcurrants. The pips are taken off by hand, originally by monks, with a goose feather, before cooking.

In Scandinavia and Schleswig-Holstein, it is often used in fruit soups and summer puddings (rødgrød, rote grütze or rode grütt). In Germany it is also used in combination with custard or meringue as a filling for tarts.

In Linz, Austria, it is the most commonly used filling for the Linzer torte. It can be enjoyed in its fresh state without the addition of sugar.

In German-speaking areas, syrup or nectar derived from the redcurrant is added to soda water and enjoyed as a refreshing drink named Johannisbeerschorle. It is so named because the redcurrants (Johannisbeeren, "John's berry" in German) are said to ripen first on St. John's Day, also known as Midsummer Day, June 24.

In Russia, redcurrants are ubiquitous and used in jams, preserves, compotes and desserts. It is also used to make kissel, a sweet healthy drink made from fresh berries or fruits (such as red currants, cherries, cranberries). The leaves have many uses in traditional medicine, such as making an infusion with black tea. Also the plants were cultivated in Russian monastery gardens in the 11th century.

See also
 Jostaberry

References

External links

Berries
Plants described in 1753
Ribes
Flora of Europe
Sour fruits